Niemur River, a perennial stream of the Murray catchment and part of the Murray–Darling basin, is located in the western Riverina region of south western New South Wales, Australia.

The river leaves Edward River, near Moonahcullah, flowing generally west north-west, joined by five minor tributaries, before reaching its confluence with the Wakool River, north of Swan Hill; descending  over its  course.

See also

 List of rivers of New South Wales
 List of rivers of Australia

References

External links
 

Rivers of New South Wales
Murray-Darling basin
Rivers in the Riverina